Greensburg Township is one of the fifteen townships of Putnam County, Ohio, United States.  The 2000 census found 1,425 people in the township.

Geography
Located in the central part of the county, it borders the following townships:
Palmer Township - north
Liberty Township - northeast corner
Ottawa Township - east
Union Township - south
Jackson Township - southwest corner
Perry Township - west
Monroe Township - northwest corner

No municipalities are located in Greensburg Township.

Name and history
The only Greensburg Township statewide, it was organized in 1835. The origin of the name Greensburg is unclear.

Government
The township is governed by a three-member board of trustees, who are elected in November of odd-numbered years to a four-year term beginning on the following January 1. Two are elected in the year after the presidential election and one is elected in the year before it. There is also an elected township fiscal officer, who serves a four-year term beginning on April 1 of the year after the election, which is held in November of the year before the presidential election. Vacancies in the fiscal officership or on the board of trustees are filled by the remaining trustees.

References

External links
County website

Townships in Putnam County, Ohio
Townships in Ohio